Boronia minutipinna is a plant in the citrus family Rutaceae and is endemic to a small area in the Kimberley region of Western Australia. It is an erect shrub with many branches, hairy stems and leaves, pinnate leaves and white to pink, four-petalled flowers with the sepals longer and wider than the petals.

Description
Its branches and leaves are covered with star-like hairs. The flowers are white to pink and are arranged singly in leaf axils. The sepals and petals increase in size as the fruit develops. Flowering has only been observed in July.

Taxonomy and naming
Boronia minutipinna was first formally described in 1997 by Marco F. Duretto from a specimen collected on the Osmond Plateau, and the description was published in  Nuytsia. According to Duretto, the specific epithet (minutipinna) is derived from the Latin minutas meaning "small" and pinnae meaning "wings", referring to the small leaflets. The word for "small" in classical Latin is minutus (masculine), minuta (feminine) or minutum (neuter).

Distribution and habitat
Boronia minutipinna is only known from the Osmond Plateau in the Kimberley region of Western Australia where it grows in sand between boulders.

Conservation
This boronia is classified as "Priority Two" by the Western Australian Government Department of Parks and Wildlife meaning that it is poorly known and from only one or a few locations.

References 

minutipinna
kalumburuensisFlora of Western Australia
Plants described in 1997
Taxa named by Marco Duretto